German submarine U-983 was a Type VIIC U-boat of Nazi Germany's Kriegsmarine during World War II.

She was ordered on 25 May 1941, and was laid down on 7 September 1942 at Blohm & Voss, Hamburg, as yard number 183. She was launched on 12 May 1943 and commissioned under the command of Leutnant zur See Hans Reimers on 16 June 1943.

Design
German Type VIIC submarines were preceded by the shorter Type VIIB submarines. U-983 had a displacement of  when at the surface and  while submerged. She had two shafts and two  propellers.

U-983 was fitted with five  torpedo tubes (four fitted at the bow and one at the stern), fourteen torpedoes or 26 TMA mines, one  SK C/35 naval gun, 220 rounds, and one twin  C/30 anti-aircraft gun. The boat had a complement of between 44 — 52 men.

Service history
Thirty-eight of the crew of forty-three survived.

References

Bibliography

External links

German Type VIIC submarines
U-boats commissioned in 1943
World War II submarines of Germany
Ships built in Hamburg
1943 ships
Maritime incidents in September 1943
World War II shipwrecks in the Baltic Sea